Bucculatrix bicolorella is a moth in the family Bucculatricidae. It was described by Pierre Chrétien in 1915. It is found in Italy.

The wingspan is about 6 mm.

References

Arctiidae genus list at Butterflies and Moths of the World of the Natural History Museum

Bucculatricidae
Moths described in 1915
Moths of Europe